McCrackin is a surname. Notable people with the surname include:

Daisy McCrackin (born 1979), American actor and singer-songwriter
Maurice McCrackin (1905–1997), American activist

See also
McCracken (surname)